The 2022 Music City 200 was an ARCA Menards Series East race that was held on May 7, 2022, at the Nashville Fairgrounds Speedway in Nashville, Tennessee. It was contested over 200 laps on the  short track. It was the fourth race of the 2022 ARCA Menards Series East season. Kyle Busch Motorsports driver Sammy Smith collected the victory, his third of the season. Jake Finch and Taylor Gray finished 2nd and third respectively.

Background

Entry list 

 (R) denotes rookie driver.
 (i) denotes driver who is ineligible for series driver points.

Practice/Qualifying

Starting Lineups

Race

Race results

References 

2022 in sports in Tennessee
Music City 200
2022 ARCA Menards Series East